Marshall Jones could refer to:

Marshall "Rock" Jones (1941–2016), American musician